1873 was the 87th season of cricket in England since the foundation of Marylebone Cricket Club (MCC). In only their fourth season as a first-class team, Gloucestershire was proclaimed joint Champion County by the media and went on to claim the still unofficial title four times in five seasons (1873, 1874, 1876 and 1877).

Player qualification rules came into force, with players having to decide at the start of a season whether they would play for the county of their birth or the county of residence. Before this, it was quite common for a player to play for two counties during the course of a single season, with by far the best-known case being star slow bowler James Southerton who played for his birth county Sussex when they had a match on and otherwise for Surrey. It is only since the residence qualifications were introduced that any quasi-official status can be ascribed to the oft-claimed Champion County title.

Champion County 

 Gloucestershire, Nottinghamshire (shared)

Playing record (by county)

Leading batsmen (qualification 15 innings)

Leading bowlers (qualification 800 balls)

Notes 
An unofficial seasonal title sometimes proclaimed by consensus of media and historians prior to December 1889 when the official County Championship was constituted. Although there are ante-dated claims prior to 1873, when residence qualifications were introduced, it is only since that ruling that any quasi-official status can be ascribed.
Includes the "County Cup" match at Lord's between Kent and Sussex
Includes a third Nottinghamshire v Yorkshire match organised privately by Nottinghamshire captain Richard Daft
Hampshire, though regarded until 1885 as first-class, played no inter-county matches between 1868 and 1869 or 1871 and 1874

References

Bibliography 
 John Lillywhite’s Cricketer's Companion (Green Lilly), Lillywhite, 1874
 James Lillywhite’s Cricketers' Annual (Red Lilly), Lillywhite, 1874
 John Wisden's Cricketers' Almanack, 1874

External links 
 CricketArchive – season summaries

1873 in English cricket
English cricket seasons in the 19th century